Lithification (from the Ancient Greek word lithos meaning 'rock' and the Latin-derived suffix -ific) is the process in which sediments compact under pressure, expel connate fluids, and gradually become solid rock.  Essentially, lithification is a process of porosity destruction through compaction and cementation. Lithification includes all the processes which convert unconsolidated sediments into sedimentary rocks. Petrifaction, though often used as a synonym, is more specifically used to describe the replacement of organic material by silica in the formation of fossils.

See also

References

Geological processes
Petrology
Sedimentary rocks